Hernán Carlos Meske (born 13 February 1969) is an Argentine football manager and former player who played as a defender.

Career
A Lanús youth graduate, Meske played for four seasons with the first team, being a part of the squad in their first-ever promotion to the Argentine Primera División. In 1993, he moved to Deportivo Español also in the top tier, being a regular starter during his five-year spell at the club.

Meske joined Quilmes in 1998, and also had a one-year stint at Bolivian side Unión Central before returning to Argentina in 2000, with Estudiantes de Buenos Aires. He retired with the side in the following year, aged 32.

After retiring, Meske was named manager of hometown side El Linqueño in 2006. In the following year, he took over Talleres de Remedios de Escalada, and subsequently worked at his first club Lanús' youth categories.

In 2020, Meske returned to Bolivia after being named general coordinator and manager of the reserve team of Blooming. On 19 August 2021, he was appointed interim manager of the main squad after Eduardo Villegas was sacked, and was definitely appointed manager until the end of the season on 7 September.

References

External links

1969 births
Living people
Argentine footballers
Footballers from Buenos Aires
Argentine Primera División players
Primera Nacional players
Club Atlético Lanús footballers
Deportivo Español footballers
Quilmes Atlético Club footballers
Estudiantes de Buenos Aires footballers
Unión Tarija players
Argentine expatriate footballers
Argentine expatriate sportspeople in Bolivia
Expatriate footballers in Bolivia
Argentine football managers
Bolivian Primera División managers
Club Blooming managers
Argentine expatriate football managers
Expatriate football managers in Bolivia
Association footballers not categorized by position